The Székely Land or Szeklerland (Székely runes: 𐲥𐳋𐳓𐳉𐳗𐳌𐳖𐳞𐳇;  and sometimes ;) is a historic and ethnographic area in today Romania, inhabited mainly by Székelys, a subgroup of Hungarians. Its cultural centre is the city of Târgu Mureș (Marosvásárhely), the largest settlement in the region.

Székelys (or Szeklers) live in the valleys and hills of the Eastern Carpathian Mountains, corresponding mostly to the present-day Harghita, Covasna, and parts of Mureș counties in Romania.

Originally, the name Székely Land denoted the territories of a number of autonomous Székely seats within Transylvania. The self-governing Székely seats had their own administrative system, and existed as legal entities from medieval times until the 1870s. The privileges of the Székely and Saxon seats were abolished and seats were replaced with counties in 1876.

Along with Transylvania and eastern parts of Hungary proper, the Székely Land became a part of Romania in 1920, in accordance with the Treaty of Trianon. In August 1940, as a consequence of the Second Vienna Award, northern territories of Transylvania, including the Székely Land, were returned to Hungary. Northern Transylvania came under the control of Soviet and Romanian forces in 1944, and were confirmed as part of Romania by the Paris Peace Treaties signed after World War II.

Under the name Magyar Autonomous Region, with Târgu-Mureș as capital, parts of the Székely Land enjoyed a certain level of autonomy between 8 September 1952 and 16 February 1968.
	
There are territorial autonomy initiatives with the aim to obtain self-governance for this region within Romania.

Geography

The exact territory of the present-day Székely Land is not disputed. The boundaries of the historical Székely does not exist legally seats and the present-day administrative divisions of Romania are dissimilar. According to Minahan its territory is an estimated . The autonomy proposal of the Szekler National Council consists of about 13,000 km2. This size is close to the extent of the historical Székely Land. However, it does not contain the region of Aranyos Seat. The UDMR's autonomy project covers a slightly bigger territory. It includes the whole territories of Mureș, Harghita, and Covasna counties.

History

The ancient period

Transylvania was populated by Thracian peoples in the First Iron Age. The area received a large influx of Scythians from the East in the first half of the first millennium BC. The Celts appeared in Transylvania in the La Tène period (c. 4th century BC).

Dacian culture presence in southeastern Transylvania is marked by discoveries such as the flagship hoard Sâncrăieni (Harghita county) or Dacian fortresses in Covasna county (Cetatea Zânelor) or Jigodin (Harghita county).

Dacian Kingdom led by Decebal the Romanian ancestors, was taken after two wars, in 106 AD by the Roman Empire under the emperor Trajan, who began organizing the new Roman province of Dacia. Southeastern Transylvania was included in the provinces of Dacia Porolissensis, Dacia Apulensis and Meuse and fortified with numerous camps such as those at Inlăceni ( Praetoria Augusta) and Sânpaul (Harghita county) Breţcu (Angustia) and Oltenia (Covasna county) or Brâncoveneşti and Călugăreni (Mureș county).

After the fall of Roman Dacia, the present-day territory of the Székely Land became part of the Thervingi kingdom "Gutthiuda". The migration of the Huns from the east pressured most of the German tribes to leave. In the Battle of Nedao the East Germanic Gepids defeated the Huns and founded Gepidia in the territory of present-day Transylvania. This marked the end of the Hunnic Empire.

The medieval period

The territory of the Székely Land was part of the Avar Khaganate. During this period, Avar and Slavic groups migrated into Transylvania. From around 900 to 1526 the area was under the direct control of the Hungarian state. The Székelys presumably settled in Transylvania in the 12th century from present day Bihar and Bihor counties.

Ancient Hungarian legends suggest a connection between the Székelys and Attila's Huns. The origin of the Székely people is still debated. The Székely seats were the traditional self-governing territorial units of the Transylvanian Székelys during medieval times. (Saxons were also organised in seats.) The Seats were not part of the traditional Hungarian county system, and their inhabitants enjoyed a higher level of freedom (especially until the 18th century) than those living in the counties.

From the 12th and 13th centuries, the Székely Land enjoyed a considerable but varying amount of autonomy, first as a part of the Kingdom of Hungary, then inside the Principality of Transylvania. The autonomy was largely due to the military service the Székely provided until the beginning of the 18th century. The medieval Székely Land was an alliance of the seven autonomous Székely seats of Udvarhely, Csík, Maros, Sepsi, Kézdi, Orbai and Aranyos. The number of seats later decreased to five, when Sepsi, Kézdi and Orbai seats were united into one territorial unit called Háromszék (literally Three seats).

The main seat was Udvarhely seat, which was also called the Principal seat At Székelyudvarhely (Odorheiu Secuiesc) were held many national assemblies of the Székelys A known exception is the 1554 assembly, which took place at Marosvásárhely (Târgu Mureș)

Modern era

Due to the Ottoman conquest Transylvania became a semi-independent polity. From the end of the 17th century, Transylvania became part of the Habsburg monarchy (later Austrian Empire), and governed by imperial governors. In 1848 during the Hungarian revolution and freedom war it was declared the reunion of Hungary proper and Transylvania.  The Austrian emperor incited the Romanians and Serbians living in Hungary and Transylvania against the Hungarians, promising them some kind of autonomy. In 1867, as a result of the Austro-Hungarian Compromise, Transylvania become again an integral part of the Kingdom of Hungary, within Austria-Hungary.

In 1876, a general administrative reform abolished all the autonomous areas in the Kingdom of Hungary and created a unified system of counties. As a result, the autonomy of the Székely Land came to an end as well. Four counties were created in its place: Udvarhely, Háromszék, Csík, and Maros-Torda. (Only half of the territory of Maros-Torda originally belonged to the Székely Land.) The isolated Aranyosszék became a district of Torda-Aranyos county.

In December 1918, in the wake of the First World War, Romanian delegates from throughout Transylvania voted to join the Kingdom of Romania. There was an attempt in Udvarhely to found a "Székely republic" on 9 January 1919; however, its creation was unsuccessful. In 1920, by the Treaty of Trianon, Transylvania along with further territories was officially ceded to the Kingdom of Romania. The Romanian language officially replaced Hungarian in the Székely Land, but Székely county boundaries were preserved, and Székely districts were able to elect their own officials at local level and to preserve Hungarian-language education.

After 1930, the Romanian authorities began to Romanianize the Hungarian population of the Székely Land, with the presence of minorities in political life being repressed. The election of Hungarians was consistently nullified. The place-names were subjected to Romanianization. The minority languages were excised from official life and the local authorities were mostly led by appointed ethnic Romanians.

In 1940, as a result of the Second Vienna Award, Northern Transylvania became part of Hungary again; this territory included most of the historical Székely areas. Hungarian authorities subsequently restored the pre-Trianon structure with slight modifications. 
Ion Gigurtu's antisemitic laws, the Romanian version of Nuremberg Laws, were replaced by Hungarian ones. The Jews of the Székely Land were subjected to particularly harsh treatment. These individuals had their citizenship status reviewed, many of them being detained. In Csíkszereda (Miercurea Ciuc), dozens of families were rounded up and expelled. The men in the area were drafted into forced labor battalions. For example, 1,200 Jewish males of Marosvásárhely (Târgu Mureș) were conscripted between 1941 and 1944; over half died in Ukraine, Poland and Hungary.

However, despite discrimination and many casualties, most of the community lived in relative safety until the March 1944 occupation of Hungary by Nazi Germany. A conference devoted to the concentration of Jews in the Székely Land was held on 28 April 1944; it covered the counties of Csík, Háromszék, Maros-Torda and Udvarhely. The area's Jews were ghettoized in Szászrégen (Reghin), Sepsiszentgyörgy (Sfântu Gheorghe) and Marosvásárhely. Roundups began on 3 May 1944 and were completed within a week. The Hungarian authorities actively participated in the crimes of the Nazis. The Jews ghettoized at Sepsiszentgyörgy were later sent to Szászrégen, whence on 4 June 1944, 3,149 were boarded on a train bound for the Auschwitz concentration camp. Three transports left Marosvásáhely for Auschwitz: on 27 May, 30 May and 8 June 1944; altogether, they carried 7,549 Jews.

On 12 September 1944, the Second Vienna Award was voided by the Allied Commission through the Armistice Agreement with Romania, and the Romanian-Soviet forces seized the area in Autumn 1944; however, the Romanian administration was expelled from these territories in October due to the activities of the Romanian paramilitary groups created in the area to avenge the atrocities committed by the Hungarians against the Romanians during the Hungarian rule in Northern Transylvania. For instance, the so-called Iuliu Maniu Guards terrorized the Székely villages, butchered the local Hungarians by axe and hatchet and operated a death camp in Feldioara. This paramilitary group was described as "a band of terrorist-chauvinistic criminals" by the Soviets. The USSR let the Romanian authorities back to the area in March 1945, and the Paris Peace Treaties officially returned Northern Transylvania to Romania.

Following the Northern Transylvania's return to Romania after World War II, a Magyar Autonomous Region was created in 1952 under the Soviets' pressure, which encompassed most of the land inhabited by the Székelys. In 1960, the region was renamed to Mureș-Magyar Autonomous Region. It was abolished in 1968, when Romania, following an administrative reform, returned to its traditional local administrative system based on counties. Roughly speaking, present-day Harghita County encompasses the former Udvarhely and Csík, the latter including Gyergyószék; Covasna County covers more or less the territory of the former Háromszék; and what was once Maros-Torda is mostly part of present-day Mureș County. The former Aranyosszék is today divided between Cluj and Alba counties.

Nicolae Ceaușescu came to power in 1965. For the next couple of decades, due to the Romanianization efforts, a large number of ethnic Romanians settled in the Székely Land. Those Székely Hungarians who possessed degrees were subjected to resettlement.
In March 1990, the city of Târgu Mureș witnessed violent clashes between ethnic Romanian and Hungarian groups.

After the fall of communism, many hoped that the former Magyar Autonomous Region, abolished by Nicolae Ceauşescu's regime, would soon be restored. This did not happen; however, there are Székely autonomy initiatives and further efforts from Székely organisations to reach a higher level of self-governance for the Székely Land within Romania.

On 4 June 2005, the Civic Forum of the Romanians of Covasna, Harghita and Mureș was founded in Miercurea Ciuc. It is an organization aimed at organizing the ethnic Romanian population in the counties that compose Székely Land.

On 2 February 2009, Romanian President Traian Băsescu met the Hungarian President László Sólyom in Budapest and discussed the issues of minority rights and regional autonomy. Băsescu stated "The Hungarian minority will never be given territorial autonomy."

In 2014, the UDMR and the Hungarian Civic Party had a joint autonomy proposal for the Székely Land, but the Szekler National Council also possessed its own suggestion.

In 2016, Hans G. Klemm, the United States Ambassador to Romania, together with other local officials, were pictured with a Székely flag during his visit to the Székely Land. The photo was posted by the mayor of Sfântu Gheorghe on Facebook. The reactions of the politicians in Bucharest were turbulent. In a response Klemm affirmed that the only two flags that are important to him, as a diplomat, are the U.S. and the Romanian ones.

Constitutional issues
Article 1 of the Romanian Constitution defines the country as a "sovereign, independent, unitary and indivisible national state." It has often been argued that, as a result of this provision, any ethnic-based territorial autonomy, including that of the Székely Land, would be unconstitutional.

The Supreme Council of National Defence of Romania declared that an autonomy of the so-called Székely Land would be unconstitutional.

Population

In 2002 the estimated ethnic composition of the Székely Land (Mureș, Covasna and Harghita counties) consisted of Hungarians (66%), Romanians (29%), Germans (1%) and Roma (4%). The area forms a Hungarian ethnic enclave within present-day Romania. Locals refer this situation as "Everybody speaks Hungarian, here you have to speak Romanian with police and public officials".

The population of the historical Székely Land (according to the 2002 census) is 409,000, 312,043 of them Hungarians, accounting for 76.65% of the total. The Hungarians represent 59% of the populations of Harghita, Covasna and Mureș counties. The percentage of Hungarians is higher in Harghita and Covasna (84.8% and 73.58% respectively), and lower in Mureș County,  (38.82%).

According to the 2011 official census, 570,033 Hungarians (53.22%) live in the counties of Covasna, Harghita and Mureș (out of a total population of 1,071,890 inhabitants). In Mureș county the Romanians have a slight majority (52.6%), while in the counties of Covasna and Harghita, the Hungarians make up the majority (79.6% and 85.9%). The 2011 census compared to the data of the previous census (2002) also shows that the Romanian ethnic ratio in the Székely Land has been decreasing (due to emigration).

Târgu Mureș is the home for the largest community of Hungarians in Romania (60,669 in 2011), but the town itself has a Romanian majority (69,702 out of 134,290 inhabitants).

Translated with www.DeepL.com/Translator (free version)

Important centers of the Székely Land are Târgu-Mureș (Marosvásárhely), Miercurea Ciuc (Csíkszereda), Sfântu Gheorghe (Sepsiszentgyörgy), and Odorheiu Secuiesc (Székelyudvarhely).

Culture

Theatres and orchestras
Târgu Mureș National Theatre is the continuator of the Székely Theater established in 1946 by Miklós Tompa; it has two language sections, Hungarian and Romanian
Tamási Áron Theatre in Sfântu Gheorghe, established in 1948
Ariel Theatre for Children and Youth in Târgu Mureș, established in 1949 (Hungarian and Romanian sections)
Târgu Mureș State Philharmonic Orchestra, established in 1950
Figura Stúdió Theatre in Gheorgheni (1990)
Csíki Játékszín Municipal Theatre in Miercurea Ciuc (1998)
Tomcsa Sándor Theatre in Odorheiu Secuiesc (1998)

Mass media

Public
TVR Târgu Mureș (Hungarian and Romanian sections)
Radio Târgu Mureș (Hungarian and Romanian sections)

Private
Erdély TV (Târgu Mureș)
Erdély FM (Târgu Mureș)
Radio GaGa (Târgu Mureș)
Sepsi Rádió (Sfântu Gheorghe)
Siculus Rádió (Târgu Secuiesc)

Education

Teleki Library in Târgu Mureș (1802)
University of Medicine, Pharmacy, Science and Technology of Târgu Mureș (1945)
Târgu Mureș University of Arts (1946)
Sapientia University (2001) (in Târgu Mureș and Miercurea Ciuc)

The following is a list of the most known high schools of each city:
Târgu-Mureş/Marosvásárhely: Bolyai Farkas, Unirea, Alexandru Papiu Ilirian
Sovata/Szováta:Domokos Kázmér
Odorheiu-Secuiesc/Székelyudvarhely: Tamási Áron, Benedek Elek 
Cristuru-Secuiesc/Székelykeresztúr: Orbán Balázs
Miercurea Ciuc/Csíkszereda: Márton Áron, Octavian Goga
Gheorgheni/Gyergyószentmiklós: Salamon Ernő
Topliţa/Maroshévíz: O. C. Tăslăuanu
Sfântu-Gheorghe/Sepsiszentgyörgy: Székely Mikó, Mihai Viteazul, Mikes Kelemen
Târgu-Secuiesc/Kézdivásárhely: Nagy Mózes
Covasna/Kovászna: Kőrösi Csoma Sándor
 
Those in italic have the Romanian language as their medium of instruction.

Sport
The Székely ice hockey team Sport Club of Csíkszereda, with mainly home trained, local players (Székelys), plays simultaneously in the Erste League (Hungarian League) and in the Romanian Ice Hockey Championship. Starting with the 2010/2011 season, the Sport Club ice hockey team participated at the championships under the name HSC Csíkszereda and that year it won its first Erste League title as well.

The team's main achievements so far:
The Romanian Championship (fifteen times winner): 1949, 1952, 1957, 1960, 1963, 1997, 2000, 2004, 2007, 2008, 2009, 2010, 2011, 2012, 2013.
The Romanian Cup (ten times winner): 1950, 1952, 1995, 2001, 2003, 2006, 2007, 2010, 2011, 2014.
Pannonian League (one-time winner): 2004.
Erste League (one-time winner): 2011.

The majority of the Romanian men's national ice hockey team consist of Székely players. The national team are ranked 28th in the 2010 IIHF World Rankings and currently compete in Division IIA.

The Székely Land football team represents the Székely Land in ConIFA competitions.

Tourist attractions

Székely fortified churches – more than 20 Székely villages count fortified churches
Baroque church at Șumuleu Ciuc (Csíksomlyó), a major Roman Catholic pilgrimage site
Rural tourism
Hiking in the Carpathians
Mofette, spas
Mineral springs, thermal baths
Salt mines (treatment against allergy and asthma)
Traditional Székely handicrafts (pottery, wood carving)
Mikó Castle
Kálnoky Castle
Teleki Library
Székely National Museum (Muzeul Național Secuiesc/Székely Nemzeti Múzeum), Sfântu Gheorghe/Sepsiszentgyörgy
Székely Museum of Ciuc (Muzeul Secuiesc al Ciucului/Csíki Székely Múzeum), Miercurea-Ciuc/Csíkszereda

Image gallery

See also
Hungarians in Romania
Magyar Autonomous Region
Csángó Land
Partium
Szekler National Council
Székely himnusz
Székely Land football team

Notes
1."The Romanian hatred of Hungarians reminds us of the Croatian hatred of Serbs. Olteanu's method was to decapitate the men "by the use of axes" or impale them in front of their families" (Eric Markusen, David Kopf, The Holocaust and strategic bombing: genocide and total war in the twentieth century, Westview Press, 1995, p. 116)

References

External links

Székely Anthem
Szeklerland Portal 
Szekler National Council 
The Population of Covasna and Harghita Counties. Aspects of Interethnic Co-Existence
Kézdi.Infó Digital Community Service

 
Geography of Transylvania
Historical regions of Transylvania
Hungarian-speaking countries and territories